The Byrd Antarctic Expedition Medal is a Congressional medal established by an Act of Congress in 1930 to commemorate the Byrd Antarctic Expedition of 1928–1930.  Presented in gold, silver and bronze, the medals were awarded to 81 individuals associated with the expedition, for a total cost of $6,560.

Appearance
The medal is circular in shape and made of gold, silver, or bronze.  The obverse depicts a relief of Admiral Byrd in fur lined arctic clothing. Around the depiction is the embossed wording: BYRD ANTARCTIC EXPEDITION 1928-1930.  The reverse bears a relief depicting the sailing ship City of New York surrounded by the text PRESENTED TO THE OFFICERS AND MEN OF THE BYRD ANTARCTIC EXPEDITION TO EXPRESS THE HIGH ADMIRATION IN WHICH THE CONGRESS AND THE AMERICAN PEOPLE HOLD THEIR HEROIC AND UNDAUNTED SERVICES IN CONNECTION WITH THE SCIENTIFIC INVESTIGATION EXPLORATION OF THE ANTARCTIC CONTINENT.  The medal is borne by a white silk ribbon with light blue center stripe.

Of the 81 men who received the medal, 65 received gold medals, 7 received silver medals, and 9 received bronze medals.

After Byrd's 1934 to 1935 Antarctic Expedition, the Second Byrd Antarctic Expedition Medal was awarded to the expedition's participants.

Noteworthy recipients
Note - the military ranks indicated are the highest the individuals achieved in their careers and not those held at the time of the expedition.

Rear Admiral Richard E. Byrd, USN - expedition commander
Colonel Bernt Balchen, USAF - chief pilot
Lieutenant Colonel Kennard F. Bubier, USMC - mechanic
Commander Jack Bursey, USCG - seaman and dog sled driver
Chief Warrant Officer Victor H. Czegka, USMC - machinist and two time Navy Cross recipient
Frank T. Davies - Canadian physicist
Dr. Lawrence Gould - geologist and second in command
Lieutenant Harold June, USN - pilot and radio operator
Colonel Ashley Chadbourne McKinley, USAF - photographer and aerial surveyor
Paul Siple, Ph.D. - a 20-year-old Boy Scout at the time of the expedition
George W. Tennant - cook

References

External links
Joint Resolution Authorizing the presentation of medals to the officers and men of the Byrd antarctic expedition., Wikisource.

1930 establishments in the United States
Awards established in 1930
Congressional Gold Medal recipients